In combinatorics, Sun's curious identity is the following identity involving binomial coefficients, first established by Zhi-Wei Sun in 2002:

Proofs 
After Sun's publication of this identity in 2002, five other proofs were obtained by various mathematicians:

 Panholzer and Prodinger's proof via generating functions; 
 Merlini and Sprugnoli's proof using Riordan arrays; 
 Ekhad and Mohammed's proof by the WZ method; 
 Chu and Claudio's proof with the help of Jensen's formula; 
 Callan's combinatorial proof involving dominos and colorings.

References

.

.

.

.

.

.

.

Factorial and binomial topics
Mathematical identities